A.O. Karditsa F.C. is a Greek football club, based in Karditsa, Karditsa. AO Karditsa holds the record of the club with the most participations in the Delta Ethniki, where it played 28 seasons in total.

History
A.O. Karditsa F.C.was founded in 1966. As a continuation of P.O.E.K.
The period 1970–1971 played for the first time in B Ethniki, where he remained until 1976. The season 1978–1979 returned to B Ethniki but relegated the same season.

In the early 1980s, after the restructuring and professionalisation of football, the AOK relegated to Delta Etniki, and from there to the Local League of Karditsa, from where he returned to Delta Ethniki in 1987.

The "blue white" go up in the Gamma Ethniki for the first time in club history. They will remain for two seasons (1998–1999, 1999–2000).

The team returned to the Football League 2 for the 2013–14 season.

Rivalries
The club has a bitter rivalry with their local neighbours Anagennisi Karditsa.

Honours
 Third Division: 1
 1969-70
 Fourth Division: 1
 1997-98

Managers
Giannis Mangos (2013–2014)
Vaios Karagiannis (2013)

Football clubs in Thessaly
Karditsa
1966 establishments in Greece
Association football clubs established in 1966